Krasnyi Oktiabr, renamed Lypske in 2016, is an urban-type settlement in Makiivka Municipality (district) in Donetsk Oblast of eastern Ukraine. The settlement is occupied by Russia, which uses the old name. Population:

Demographics
Native language as of the Ukrainian Census of 2001:
 Ukrainian 32.91%
 Russian 66.50%
 Belarusian 0.1%

References

Urban-type settlements in Donetsk Raion